DYGL are a four-piece indie rock band from Tokyo, Japan.

Three members of the band, Akiyama, Kachi, and Kamoto, were also members of five-piece indie rock band Ykiki Beat, which officially disbanded in 2017.

Band members
 Nobuki Akiyama – lead vocals, guitars
 Kohei Kamoto – drums
 Yosuke Shimonaka – guitar
 Yotaro Kachi – bass

Biography
DYGL is a band formed in Tokyo, Japan.
DYGL (pronounced Day-glo) might have begun via a hometown tradition, but it's in this cross-continental, wide-reaching approach that they've truly found their place.

The band released their first EP recorded in the United States. As Nobuki Akiyama (Vocalist) said that their first album would be the first step for public recognition, they successfully released the 1st album in April 2017, which was produced by Albert Hammond Jr. With huge support from Albert, DYGL did an Asia tour, a Japan tour and did some performances the United Kingdom and United States.

Discography

Albums

Studio albums

Extended plays

Singles

References

Japanese alternative rock groups
Musical groups established in 2013
2013 establishments in Japan
Musical groups from Tokyo